The Bloudan Conference of 1946 (Arabic transliteration: al-Mu'tamar al-'Arabi al-Qawmi fi Bludan) was the second pan-Arab summit held in Bloudan, Syria in 1946, following the first conference in 1937. It was called to for the Council of the Arab League to consider the Anglo-American Committee of Inquiry report which had been published on 20 April 1946.

References

Bibliography

1946 in politics
20th-century diplomatic conferences
Arab nationalism in Mandatory Palestine
Diplomatic conferences in Syria
History of Mandatory Palestine
1946 in Syria
1946 conferences